Vana daami visiit (English: The Visit of the Old Lady) is a 2006 Estonian film directed by Roman Baskin and based on the 1956 play The Visit by Friedrich Dürrenmatt.

Cast

References

External links
 
 Vana daami visiit, Estonian Film Database (EFIS)

2006 films
Estonian drama films
Estonian-language films
Films based on works by Friedrich Dürrenmatt